St. Lucie County Aquarium is a public aquarium in Fort Pierce, St. Lucie County, Florida. It contains the Smithsonian Marine Ecosystems Exhibit, which is a 3000-gallon model of a coral reef ecosystem; the exhibit was retired in 2000 from the National Museum of Natural History. The other exhibits represent ecosystems of the Indian River Lagoon and the surrounding coast.

References

Aquaria in Florida
Fort Pierce, Florida
St. Lucie County, Florida